Shontel Greene known as Baltimore’s Queen is an American nurse who stars in season 3 of American Gangster: Trap Queens showing on BET+.

Life and career 
Greene’s mother was a nurse addicted to intravenous use of drugs which made her sick and later died of AIDS. Greene faced a difficult and traumatic time at the age of 14 following the death of her mother. Unable to pay her school fees and a $3,000 eviction notice, Greene opted for the doping game to raise money for her family needs. Her drug deal exposed her to a lot of dangers including being kidnapped, robbed and arrested multiple times and was shot on one occasion. Later, she realised the importance of education and went back to school earning two master’s degrees and a doctorate degree in nursing. She established multiple businesses including Nursez R Us, a healthcare facility in Maryland.

References 

American nurses
People from Baltimore County, Maryland
Writers from Baltimore
Year of birth missing (living people)
Living people